Barkskins is an American drama television series, based on the novel of the same name by Annie Proulx, that premiered on May 25, 2020 on National Geographic. The series was filmed in Quebec. The village built for the series was later put up for sale. The show was cancelled after one season.

Premise
Barkskins chronicles "the arrival of English and French colonists to the New World through the stories of two immigrants in New France, René Sel and Charles Duquet, who work as wood-cutters ('Barkskins, the term for indentured servants’) and of their descendants."

Cast
 Aneurin Barnard as Hamish Goames
 Christian Cooke as Rene Sel
 David Thewlis as Claude Trepagny
 David Wilmot as Constable Bouchard
 James Bloor as Charles Duquet
 Kaniehtiio Horn as Mari
 Lily Sullivan as Delphine
 Marcia Gay Harden as Mathilde Geffard
 Tallulah Haddon as Melissande
 Thomas M. Wright as Elisha Cooke
 Zahn McClarnon as Yvon
 Matthew Lillard as Gus Lafarge
 Domenic Di Rosa as Father Gabriel
 Eric Schweig as Chief Tehonikonhraken
 Leni Parker as Mother Sabrine

Episodes

Production
On January 6, 2016, it was announced during the Television Critics Association's annual winter press tour that National Geographic had partnered with Scott Rudin Productions to option the screen rights to Annie Proulx's then-forthcoming novel Barkskins.

On December 3, 2018, it was reported that National Geographic had given the production a series order for a first season consisting of eight episodes. The series was created by Elwood Reid who was also expected to executive produce alongside Scott Rudin, Eli Bush, and Garrett Basch. Additional production companies involved with the series were slated to consist of Fox 21 Television Studios. On February 10, 2019, it was announced that David Slade would direct the pilot episode of the series and serve as an executive producer.

Reception
On Rotten Tomatoes, the series holds an approval rating of 55% based on 11 reviews with an average rating of 7.25/10. On Metacritic, the series has a weighted average score of 65 out of 100, based on 6 critics, indicating "generally favorable reviews".

References

External links
 
 
 

2020 American television series debuts
2020s American drama television series
English-language television shows
National Geographic (American TV channel) original programming
Television shows based on American novels
Television series by Touchstone Television
First Nations television series
Television shows filmed in Quebec